KABA 90.3 FM is a radio station licensed to Louise, Texas.  The station broadcasts a Spanish Religious format and is owned by Aleluya Broadcasting Network.

References

External links
KABA's official website

ABA
ABA (FM)
Wharton County, Texas